NGC 1189 is a barred spiral galaxy approximately 105 million light-years away from Earth in the constellation of Eridanus. It was discovered by American astronomer Francis Leavenworth on December 2, 1885 with the 26" refractor at Leander McCormick Observatory.

NGC 1189 has extended clumpy star formation throughout its spiral arms with remarkably little associated stellar light, which is striking in the color images.

Together with NGC 1190, NGC 1191, NGC 1192 and NGC 1199 it forms Hickson Compact Group 22 (HCG 22) galaxy group. Although they are considered members of this group, NGC 1191 and NGC 1192 are in fact background objects, since they are much further away compared to the other members of this group.

Image gallery

See also 
 Barred spiral galaxy 
 Hickson Compact Group
 List of NGC objects (1001–2000)
 Eridanus (constellation)

References

External links 

 
 SEDS

Barred spiral galaxies
Eridanus (constellation)
1189
11503
Hickson Compact Groups
Astronomical objects discovered in 1885
Discoveries by Francis Leavenworth